Un baúl lleno de miedo ("A Trunk Full of Fear" in English) is a Mexican comedy film directed by Joaquín Bissner, written by Danilo Cuéllar and produced by Roberto Gómez Bolaños. Released in 1997, it stars Diana Bracho and Julián Pastor.

Plot
Esteban Estévez, a mystery novel writer, must finish his new work, so in search of inspiration, he moves to an isolated cabin in the woods with his wife, Cristina, and his assistant, Federico. Secretly, Federico had been renting the cabin to a mysterious woman whom he urges to leave the house before Esteban and Cristina arrive. While leaving, the woman decides to keep an uncomfortable thing inside the house: a trunk containing a corpse.

Cast
 Diana Bracho as Cristina de Estévez
 Julián Pastor as Esteban Estévez
 Carlos Espejel as Federico
 Patricia Llaca as Laura Toledo
 Maya Mishalska as Emilia
 Miguel Ángel Fuentes as the Black Vampire
 Arturo Amor as Dead Man

Production
Diana Bracho made the film two years after having made Between Pancho Villa and a Naked Woman.

In his autobiography Sin querer queriendo, Roberto Gómez Bolaños affirmed that the film suffered from a "very poor promotion", and as a result "it did not achieve the expected success", with Gómez Bolaños stating that the same had happened with the previous film he produced, ¡Que vivan los muertos!.

References

External links 
 

1997 films
1990s Spanish-language films
1997 comedy films
Mexican comedy films
1990s Mexican films